The 1938 AAA Championship Car season consisted of two races, beginning in Speedway, Indiana on May 30 and concluding in Syracuse, New York on September 10.  There were also two non-championship events.  The AAA National Champion and Indianapolis 500 winner was Floyd Roberts.

Schedule and results
All races running on Dirt/Brick Oval. In IZOD IndyCar Series 2011 Historical Record Book, the Indianapolis Motor Speedway is, from 1911 to 1938, listed as a "brick track" type circuit. (page 73)

Leading National Championship standings

References

See also
 1938 Indianapolis 500

AAA Championship Car season
AAA Championship Car
1938 in American motorsport